Ixtapangajoya is a town and one of the 119 municipalities of Chiapas, in southern Mexico.

As of 2010, the municipality had a total population of 5,478, up from 4,707 as of 2005. It covers an area of 201.2 km².

As of 2010, the town of Ixtapangajoya had a population of 1,272, up from 826 as of 2005. Other than the town of Ixtapangajoya, the municipality had 24 localities, the largest of which (with 2010 populations in parentheses) was: La Gloria (1,478), classified as urban, and classified as rural.

References

Municipalities of Chiapas